Richard Darmanin (born 1 March 1956) is a Puerto Rican sailor. He competed in the Tornado event at the 1976 Summer Olympics.

References

External links
 

1956 births
Living people
Puerto Rican male sailors (sport)
Olympic sailors of Puerto Rico
Sailors at the 1976 Summer Olympics – Tornado
Place of birth missing (living people)
20th-century Puerto Rican people